Fatuma Roba (born 18 December 1973) is an Ethiopian long-distance runner, best known for being the first African woman to win a gold medal in the women's Olympic marathon race at the Atlanta 1996 Summer Olympics and for winning three successive Boston Marathons.

Early life
Fatuma Roba was born on 18 December 1973 in Bekoji, Ethiopia. As Fatuma grew up, there were no female role models in long distance running within Ethiopia, only Abebe Bikila. While Fatuma was at school, she was not encouraged to run but decided to continue regardless. She was coached by Sentayehu Eshetu, who had previously worked with athletes such as Derartu Tulu.

Running career
She made her first national team in 1988, in the half marathon. That year she was in the top ten in the world championships, by 1992 she had improved to sixth. After coming first in the juniors and seventh overall in the New York Mini Marathon, she decided to try a full length marathon. So in 1994, she took part in the Paris Marathon, finishing 19th, later saying "when I finished I said, ;Never again, never again will I do this distance, it is too long!' I drank too much water, had stomach troubles, and after 14km I was finished."

She gave up the longer distance for the following year, but with 25 days to go until the 1995 World Championships in Athletics, it was suggested that she should compete since Ethiopia was not sending anyone else. So she competed, and ran well up until the  mark, but then felt dizzy and collapsed several times. She finished 19th, with a time of 2:39:27, but her performance put her in hospital afterwards.

But Fatuma decided to continue training at that distance. She won her first marathon at Marrakech in early 1996, before winning the Rome Marathon two months later. Between the two runs, she improved her personal best time by a minute. After the victory in Rome, she was selected for the Ethiopian team at the 1996 Summer Olympics, in Atlanta, United States, and intensified her training. She later said that by the  point in the women's marathon at the Atlanta Games, she was certain she had won the race because her fellow runners were tiring although she was finding the pace comfortable. With her victory and the gold medal, Fatuma became the first woman from an African nation to win the women's marathon at an Olympic Games.

Fatuma also won three straight Boston Marathons from 1997–1999. The three-time Boston champion narrowly missed a fourth straight title in 2000, coming in third in the closest finish in race history. She later said "Well, for me the greatest of all marathons is of course the Olympic Marathon, but second place is Boston."

Personal bests
10000m – 32:25 (2000)
Half-marathon – 1:09:01 (2001)
Marathon – 2:23:21 (1998)

Achievements

References

External links
Female Athletes: Fatuma Roba

1973 births
Living people
Athletes (track and field) at the 1996 Summer Olympics
Athletes (track and field) at the 2000 Summer Olympics
Ethiopian female long-distance runners
Ethiopian female marathon runners
Olympic athletes of Ethiopia
Olympic gold medalists for Ethiopia
Boston Marathon female winners
Medalists at the 1996 Summer Olympics
Olympic gold medalists in athletics (track and field)
20th-century Ethiopian women
21st-century Ethiopian women